Emilio López Navarro (born 10 May 1986 in Guadalajara) is a former professional Mexican footballer who last played for Venados on loan from Querétaro.

External links
Ascenso MX

Living people
Mexican footballers
Footballers from Guadalajara, Jalisco
1986 births
Association football midfielders
21st-century Mexican people